Jon Bartley Stewart is an American philosopher and historian of philosophy. He specializes in 19th century Continental philosophy with an emphasis on the thought of Kierkegaard and Hegel. Stewart currently works as a researcher at the Institute of Philosophy at the Slovak Academy of Sciences.

Life
Stewart earned his BA in Philosophy in 1984 from the University of California, Santa Cruz, where he studied with David Hoy. He received his MA in 1986 and his PhD in 1992 from the University of California, San Diego, where he studied with Henry Allison, Nicholas Jolley, Robert B. Pippin and Frederick A. Olafson. His dissertation was entitled The Transition from "Consciousness" to "Self-Consciousness" in Hegel's Phenomenology of Spirit.

Stewart did research for his dissertation at the Westfälische Wilhelms-Universität Münster in 1989-90, where he worked together with Ludwig Siep. From 1990-91 Stewart had a research assistantship at the same university, where he was an assistant for Jürgen-Gerhard Blühdorn. After completing his dissertation in the spring of 1992 Stewart returned to Münster with a postdoctoral grant.

From 1993-94 Stewart had a grant to do post-doctoral research at the Université Libre in Brussels (where he worked with Marc Richir) and at the Katholieke Universiteit in Leuven, Belgium. Stewart received another postdoctoral grant, which allowed him to pursue his research from 1994-95 at the Humboldt-Universität in Berlin, where he worked with Volker Gerhardt.

In 1996 Stewart was awarded a two-year postdoctoral grant from, what was then, the newly created Søren Kierkegaard Research Centre at the University of Copenhagen. This grant was extended and eventually turned into a regular research position. In 2003 he defended his Habilitation thesis at the Faculty of Theology at the University of Copenhagen. In 2005 he was Guest Professor at the Philosophy Department, at the University of Iceland. In 2007 he completed a second Habilitation thesis, this time in Philosophy at the University of Copenhagen. In the same year he was elected into the Royal Danish Academy of Sciences and Letters. In 2008-2009 Stewart received a fellowship to work at the Collegium Budapest, Institute for Advanced Study. In 2010 he was Guest Professor at the Philosophy Department at the Universidad de los Andes, Santiago de Chile. He has also had several research stays at the Hong Kierkegaard Library at St. Olaf College, Northfield, Minnesota (2006, 2011, 2012).

From 2016-2018 he was affiliated with Harvard University. He worked as Research Fellow at the Radcliffe Institute for Advanced Study from 2016–17, and then as Visiting Scholar at the Center for European Studies.

Since 2018 he has been a Research Fellow at the Institute for Philosophy at the Slovak Academy of Sciences in Bratislava.

Academic work
Stewart is best known for his work in the fields of German idealism, existentialism, philosophy of religion, and Hegel and Kierkegaard studies. He has also done much to make the philosophy and culture of the Danish Golden Age better known internationally. His work is broadly interdisciplinary, touching on fields such as philosophy, religious studies, literature, history and Scandinavian Studies. His philosophical corpus includes research monographs, translations and editorial work. He is also known as an organizer and administrator of major research projects.

Monographs
Stewart's first book, entitled The Unity of Hegel's Phenomenology of Spirit: A Systematic Interpretation (Evanston, Illinois: Northwestern University Press) appeared in 2000. The subject of the book is a traditional problem in Hegel studies, concerning the unity of Hegel's book The Phenomenology of Spirit. The long-term trend in Hegel studies has been to regard Hegel's remarks about the systematic nature of his philosophy as simply indefensible. In contrast to this Stewart argues that this view tends to obscure a good deal with respect to different analyses of Hegel's work and thought, since it takes them out of their larger context from which they ultimately derive their meaning and in which they were intended to be understood. In this way Stewart aims to understand the Phenomenology as a part of a larger philosophical system and as a coherent and unified philosophical work in its own right.

Stewart's second book, Kierkegaard's Relations to Hegel Reconsidered (New York: Cambridge University Press 2003) marked a major shift in Kierkegaard studies; and was widely reviewed in academic journals, as well as by a Danish newspaper. Before this book, a particular view of the relationship between Hegel and Kierkegaard had dominated most of the secondary literature (a view which was largely due to the influence of the Danish scholar Niels Thulstrup). In a series of articles and above all his influential book Kierkegaard's Relation to Hegel (trans. by George L. Stengren, Princeton: Princeton University Press 1980) Thulstrup presented what became the orthodox view of Kierkegaard's relation to Hegel. Thulstrup's main claim was that Kierkegaard has nothing whatsoever in common with Hegel. This view was profoundly influential in the secondary literature, and was taken up uncritically by a number of scholars of nineteenth-century European philosophy.

Kierkegaard's Relations to Hegel Reconsidered challenges this standard view as over-simplistic. Stewart shows that when one examines Kierkegaard's works carefully, one finds that his relation to Hegel was in fact considerably more complicated than Thulstrup, and the standard view, would have one believe. At every stage of Kierkegaard's literary career, there were points of overlap between his thought and that of Hegel. Kierkegaard in fact had many different relations to Hegel that developed over time. Thus, it is impossible to speak, as Thulstrup and so many others would like to, of Kierkegaard's relation to Hegel. The individual passages in his works examined by Stewart display different kinds of relations: inspirational, revisionary, critical, etc.

Kierkegaard's Relations to Hegel Reconsidered embodies a major theme of Stewart's work, which is simply the attempt to understand historical figures (such as Kierkegaard and his contemporaries) in terms of their own time and context. By beginning from historical sources, such as the books and journals in which the debates between Kierkegaard and his contemporaries were carried out, Stewart attempts to come to an understanding of how Kierkegaard would have understood himself. Stewart is perhaps best known as a major proponent of this historical approach to Kierkegaard (and, indeed, the Danish Golden Age in general). By attempting to understand how Kierkegaard would have understood himself, and how he would have been understood by his contemporaries, Stewart has exposed numerous mis-conceptions that stem from our previous lack of knowledge about Kierkegaard's place in the history and culture of Nineteenth Century Denmark. Chief among these mis-conceptions, in Kierkegaard's Relations to Hegel Reconsidered, being Kierkegaard's relation to Hegel.

It is generally agreed by reviewers that Kierkegaard's Relations to Hegel Reconsidered, made its mark on research in many different ways. For example, in addition to demonstrating the importance of Danish intellectual history and culture to understanding Kierkegaard, Stewart's work has spawned a wealth of interest in some of the individual figures of this movement such as Johan Ludvig Heiberg and Hans Lassen Martensen. Fourth, it has demonstrated the importance of source-work research in Kierkegaard studies.

In continuing to show the relevance of culture and history to understanding the intellectual and philosophical debates of the Danish Golden Age, in 2007 Stewart published A History of Hegelianism in Golden Age Denmark, Tome I, The Heiberg Period: 1824-1836 (Copenhagen: C.A. Reitzel 2007) and A History of Hegelianism in Golden Age Denmark, Tome II, The Martensen Period: 1837-1842 (Copenhagen: C.A. Reitzel 2007). These studies constitute the most detailed investigations into the influence of Hegel's philosophy on Danish Golden Age culture ever undertaken, and their significance and contribution acknowledge in reviews in the Danish press.

In 2010 Stewart published Idealism and Existentialism: Hegel and Nineteenth and Twentieth-Century European Philosophy (New York and London: Continuum International Publishing 2010). Here Stewart continues to develop the conclusions that he reached in Kierkegaard's Relations to Hegel Reconsidered. The history of philosophy in the first half of the 19th century has been read as a confrontation between the overambitious rationalistic system of Hegel and the devastating criticisms of it by Kierkegaard. In this book Stewart undermines this popular view of the radical break between idealism and existentialism by means of a series of detailed studies in specific episodes of European thought. As a whole, this book represents an important attempt to demonstrate the long shadow cast by Kant and Hegel over the subsequent history of European philosophy.

In 2013 Stewart published The Unity of Content and Form in Philosophical Writing, in which he argues that there is a close relation between content and form in philosophical writing. With this work he tries to demonstrate the uniformity of today’s philosophical writing by contrasting it with that of the past. Taking specific texts from the history of philosophy and literature as case studies, Stewart shows how the use of genres like dialogues, plays and short stories were an entirely suitable and effective means of presenting and arguing for philosophical positions given the concrete historical and cultural contexts in which they appeared. The book has been regarded as a challenge to current conventions of philosophical practice. Two conferences organized by the Hungarian Academy of Science were dedicated to this work: “The Registers of Philosophy I,” Budapest, Hungary, May 9, 2015 and “The Registers of Philosophy II,” Budapest, Hungary, May 14, 2016.

In 2013 Stewart created a MOOC for the University of Copenhagen entitled Søren Kierkegaard: Subjectivity, Irony and the Crisis of Modernity. This course was launched as a free online course on the Coursera platform (https://www.coursera.org/course/kierkegaard). This introduction to Kierkegaard’s life and thought proved to be very successful with thousands of online students from around the world. In 2015 Stewart published a book with the same title, which was based on the online course. The book is thus an introductory text that attempts to introduce the thought of Søren Kierkegaard to first-time readers.

Stewart’s The Cultural Crisis of the Danish Golden Age: Heiberg, Martensen and Kierkegaard appeared in 2015. This work traces the different aspects and dimensions of what was perceived as a crisis by many of the intellectuals and artists of the period of the Danish Golden Age. But far from being something negative or destructive, it was a motivating and stimulating force that helped to make the period what it was. Stewart argues that the crisis can be seen as one of the central defining elements of what we know as Danish Golden Age culture. The work also tries to make the case that many of the key elements of the crisis can still be found in our modern world today. Johan Ludvig Heiberg’s diagnosis of the period as suffering from relativism, subjectivism and nihilism sounds strikingly familiar to the modern reader. When seen in this manner, the Danish Golden Age becomes profoundly interesting and relevant for the broad spectrum of problems of modernity.

Translations
In an attempt to promote historical source-work research, Stewart founded the translation series Texts from Golden Age Denmark in 2005. The idea behind this series was to present the international reader with classic texts from the Danish Golden Age that had some relevance for Kierkegaard's thought. In this way readers could judge for themselves the importance of these works. Each volume of the series presents key texts in dialogue with one another. The volumes are supplemented with detailed introductions and explanatory notes that put the featured texts into their proper historical perspective and indicate the numerous links to Kierkegaard's works. This series was published at C.A. Reitzel Publishers from 2005 until 2007, and since 2008 with Museum Tusculanum Press. This series has helped to change the way Scandinavian Studies has been taught in the Anglophone world. These texts have become standard reference works in Kierkegaard research.

Editorial work
Stewart has been involved in numerous editorial projects. Most notably, he was the editor-in-chief of the monumental series, Kierkegaard Research: Sources, Reception and Resources. This series was published from 2007-2017, and with its 58 volumes is the largest series of Kierkegaard secondary literature ever undertaken. He is also the co-editor of the Kierkegaard Studies Yearbook and the Kierkegaard Studies Monograph Series. He is also the founder and general editor of Danish Golden Age Studies and Texts from Golden Age Denmark.

Awards
Stewart has won many distinguished awards and prizes, from among others the Alexander von Humboldt Foundation, the Belgian American Educational Foundation, the Heinrich Hertz Foundation and the German Academic Exchange Service. He is an Honorary Member of the Sociedad Académica Kierkegaard, Mexico and the Biblioteca Kierkegaard Argentina. In 2000 he was the recipient of the Inger Sjöberg Translation Prize from the American-Scandinavian Foundation for his translation of Johan Ludvig Heiberg's On the Significance of Philosophy for the Present Age. A special session of the American Søren Kierkegaard Society was dedicated to his book, Kierkegaard's Relations to Hegel Reconsidered, at the Annual Meeting of American Academy of Religion in San Antonio, Texas on November 20, 2004. In 2011 a special issue of the Kierkegaard Newsletter (no. 58, November 2011) was dedicated to his work.  In the same year Stewart gave the George W. Utech Memorial Kierkegaard Seminar at the Hong Kierkegaard Library at St. Olaf College.

Bibliography

Books by Jon Stewart
The Unity of Hegel's Phenomenology of Spirit: A Systematic Interpretation, Evanston, Illinois: Northwestern University Press 2000.
Kierkegaard's Relations to Hegel Reconsidered, New York: Cambridge University Press 2003. (paperback, 2007.)
A History of Hegelianism in Golden Age Denmark, Tome I, The Heiberg Period: 1824-1836, Copenhagen: C.A. Reitzel 2007 (Danish Golden Age Studies, vol. 3).
A History of Hegelianism in Golden Age Denmark, Tome II, The Martensen Period: 1837-1842, Copenhagen: C.A. Reitzel 2007 (Danish Golden Age Studies, vol. 3).
Idealism and Existentialism: Hegel and Nineteenth and Twentieth-Century European Philosophy, New York and London: Continuum International Publishing 2010. (paperback, 2012.)
The Unity of Content and Form in Philosophical Writing: The Perils of Conformity, London, New Delhi, New York and Sydney: Bloomsbury 2013 (Bloomsbury Studies in Philosophy).
The Cultural Crisis of the Danish Golden Age: Heiberg, Martensen and Kierkegaard, Copenhagen: Museum Tusculanum Press 2015 (Danish Golden Age Studies, vol. 9).
Søren Kierkegaard: Subjectivity, Irony and the Crisis of Modernity, Oxford: Oxford University Press 2015.
 Hegel’s Interpretation of the Religions of the World: The Logic of the Gods, Oxford: Oxford University Press 2018.

Anthologies edited by Jon Stewart
 The Hegel Myths and Legends, Evanston, Illinois: Northwestern University Press 1996.
 The Phenomenology of Spirit Reader: Critical and Interpretive Essays, Albany, New York: SUNY Press 1998.
 The Debate Between Sartre and Merleau-Ponty, Evanston, Illinois: Northwestern University Press 1998.
 Kierkegaard and his Contemporaries: The Culture of Golden Age Denmark, Berlin and New York: Walter de Gruyter 2003 (Kierkegaard Studies Monograph Series, vol. 10).
 Kierkegaard and his German Contemporaries, Tome I, Philosophy, Tome II, Theology, Tome III, Literature and Aesthetics, Aldershot: Ashgate 2007-2008 (Kierkegaard Research: Sources, Reception and Resources, vol. 6).
 Johan Ludvig Heiberg: Philosopher, Littérateur, Dramaturge, and Political Thinker, Copenhagen: Museum Tusculanum Press 2008 (Danish Golden Age Studies, vol. 5).
 Kierkegaard and the Patristic and Medieval Traditions, Aldershot and Burlington: Ashgate 2008 (Kierkegaard Research: Sources, Reception and Resources, vol. 4).
 Kierkegaard's International Reception, Tome I, Northern and Western Europe, Tome II, Southern, Central and Eastern Europe, Tome III, The Near East, Asia, Australia and the Americas, Farnham and Burlington: Ashgate 2009 (Kierkegaard Research: Sources, Reception and Resources, vol. 8).
 Kierkegaard and the Roman World, Farnham and Burlington: Ashgate 2009 (Kierkegaard Research: Sources, Reception and Resources, vol. 3).
 Kierkegaard and the Renaissance and Modern Traditions, Tome I, Philosophy, Tome II, Theology, Tome III, Literature, Drama and Music, Farnham and Burlington: Ashgate 2009 (Kierkegaard Research: Sources, Reception and Resources, vol. 5).
 Kierkegaard and his Danish Contemporaries, Tome I, Philosophy, Politics and Social Theory, Tome II, Theology, Tome III, Literature, Drama and Aesthetics, Farnham and Burlington: Ashgate 2009 (Kierkegaard Research: Sources, Reception and Resources, vol. 7).
 Kierkegaard and Existentialism, Farnham and Burlington: Ashgate 2011 (Kierkegaard Research: Sources, Reception and Resources, vol. 9).
 Kierkegaard's Influence on the Social Sciences, Farnham and Burlington: Ashgate 2011 (Kierkegaard Research: Sources, Reception and Resources, vol. 13).
 Kierkegaard's Influence on Social-Political Thought, Farnham and Burlington: Ashgate 2011 (Kierkegaard Research: Sources, Reception and Resources, vol. 14).
 Hans Lassen Martensen: Theologian, Philosopher and Social Critic, Copenhagen: Museum Tusculanum Press 2012 (Danish Golden Age Studies, vol. 6).
 Kierkegaard's Influence on Philosophy, Tome I, German and Scandinavian Philosophy, Tome II, Francophone Philosophy, Tome III, Anglophone Philosophy, Farnham and Burlington: Ashgate 2012 (Kierkegaard Research: Sources, Reception and Resources, vol. 11).
 Kierkegaard's Influence on Theology, Tome I, German Protestant Theology, Tome II, Anglophone and Scandinavian Protestant Theology, Tome III, Catholic and Jewish Theology, Farnham and Burlington: Ashgate 2012 (Kierkegaard Research: Sources, Reception and Resources, vol. 10).
 The Heibergs and the Theater: Between Vaudeville, Romantic Comedy and National Drama, Copenhagen: Museum Tusculanum Press 2012 (Danish Golden Age Studies, vol. 7).
 Kierkegaard’s Influence on Literature and Criticism, Tome I, The Germanophone World, Tome II, Denmark, Tome III, Sweden and Norway, Tome IV, The Anglophone World, Tome V, The Romance Languages and Central and Eastern Europe, Farnham and Burlington: Ashgate 2013 (Kierkegaard Research: Sources, Reception and Resources, vol. 12).
 A Companion to Kierkegaard, Malden, Massachusetts, Oxford, and Chichester: Wiley Blackwell 2015 (Blackwell Companions to Philosophy, vol. 58).
 Kierkegaard Secondary Literature, Tome I, Catalan, Chinese, Czech, Danish and Dutch, Tome II, English, A-K, Tome III, English, L-Z, Tome IV, Finnish, French, Galician, and German, Tome V, Greek, Hebrew, Hungarian, Italian, Japanese, Norwegian, and Polish, Tome VI, Portuguese, Romanian, Russian, Slovak, Spanish, and Swedish, Farnham and Burlington: Ashgate 2016 and London and New York: Routledge 2017 (Kierkegaard Research: Sources, Reception and Resources, vol. 18).

Editions of primary texts by Jon Stewart
 Miscellaneous Writings by G.W.F. Hegel, Evanston, Illinois: Northwestern University Press 2002.

Translations by Jon Stewart
 Heiberg's On the Significance of Philosophy for the Present Age and Other Texts, Copenhagen: C.A. Reitzel 2005 (Texts from Golden Age Denmark, vol. 1). 
 Heiberg's Speculative Logic and Other Texts, Copenhagen: C.A. Reitzel 2006 (Texts from Golden Age Denmark, vol. 2).
 Heiberg's Introductory Lecture to the Logic Course and Other Texts, Copenhagen: C.A. Reitzel 2007 (Texts from Golden Age Denmark, vol. 3). 
 Heiberg's Contingency Regarded from the Point of View of Logic and Other Texts, Copenhagen: Museum Tusculanum Press 2008 (Texts from Golden Age Denmark, vol. 4).
 Mynster's "Rationalism, Supernaturalism" and the Debate about Mediation, Copenhagen: Museum Tusculanum Press 2009 (Texts from Golden Age Denmark, vol. 5).
 Heiberg's Perseus and Other Texts, Copenhagen: Museum Tusculanum Press 2011 (Texts from Golden Age Denmark, vol. 6).
Sibbern’s Remarks and Investigations Primarily Concerning Hegel’s Philosophy, Copenhagen: Museum Tusculanum Press 2018 (Texts from Golden Age Denmark, vol. 7).

Works co-edited by Jon Stewart
 Kierkegaard Revisited: Proceedings from the Conference "Kierkegaard and the Meaning of Meaning It", ed. by Niels Jørgen Cappelørn and Jon Stewart, Berlin and New York: Walter de Gruyter 1997 (Kierkegaard Studies Monograph Series, vol. 1).
 Kierkegaard und Schelling. Freiheit, Angst und Wirklichkeit, ed. by Jochem Hennigfeld and Jon Stewart, Berlin and New York: Walter de Gruyter 2003 (Kierkegaard Studies Monograph Series, vol. 8).
 Tänkarens mångfald. Nutida perspektiv på Søren Kierkegaard, ed. by Lone Koldtoft, Jon Stewart and Jan Holmgaard, Göteborg and Stockholm: Makadam Förlag 2005.
 Kierkegaard and the Greek World, Tome I, Socrates and Plato, Tome II, Aristotle and other Greek Thinkers, ed. by Jon Stewart and Katalin Nun, Farnham and Burlington: Ashgate 2010 (Kierkegaard Research: Sources, Reception and Resources, vol. 2).
 Kierkegaard and the Bible, Tome I, The Old Testament, Tome II, The New Testament, ed. by Lee C. Barrett and Jon Stewart, Farnham and Burlington: Ashgate 2010 (Kierkegaard Research: Sources, Reception and Resources, vol. 1).
 Kierkegaard’s Concepts, Tome I, Absolute to Church, Tome II, Classicism to Enthusiasm, Tome III, Envy to Incognito, Tome IV, Individual to Novel, Tome V, Objectivity to Sacrifice, Tome VI, Salvation to Writing, ed. by Steven M. Emmanuel, William McDonald and Jon Stewart, Farnham and Burlington: Ashgate 2013-2015 (Kierkegaard Research: Sources, Reception and Resources, vol. 15).
 The Authenticity of Faith in Kierkegaard’s Philosophy, ed. by Tamar Aylat-Yaguri and Jon Stewart, Newcastle upon Tyne: Cambridge Scholars Publishing 2013. 
 Kierkegaard’s Literary Figures and Motifs, Tome I, Agamemnon to Guadalquivir, Tome II, Gulliver to Zerlina, ed. by Katalin Nun and Jon Stewart, Farnham and Burlington: Ashgate 2014-2015 (Kierkegaard Research: Sources, Reception and Resources, vol. 16).
 The Auction Catalogue of Kierkegaard’s Library, ed. by Katalin Nun, Gerhard Schreiber and Jon Stewart, Farnham and Burlington: Ashgate 2015 (Kierkegaard Research: Sources, Reception and Resources, vol. 20).
 Kierkegaard’s Pseudonyms, ed. by Katalin Nun and Jon Stewart, Farnham and Burlington: Ashgate 2015 (Kierkegaard Research: Sources, Reception and Resources, vol. 17).
 Kierkegaard Bibliography, Tome I, Afrikaans to Dutch, Tome II, English, Tome III, Estonian to Hebrew, Tome IV, Hungarian to Korean, Tome V, Latvian to Ukrainian, ed. by Peter Šajda and Jon Stewart, London and New York: Routledge 2017 (Kierkegaard Research: Sources, Reception and Resources, vol. 19).
 Magnús Eiríksson: A Forgotten Contemporary of Kierkegaard, ed. by Gerhard Schreiber and Jon Stewart, Copenhagen: Museum Tusculanum 2017 (Danish Golden Age Studies, vol. 10).

References

External links
 
 Institute of Philosophy, Slovak Academy of Sciences
 Kierkegaard Research: Sources, Reception and Resources
 Texts from Golden Age Denmark
 Danish Golden Age Studies
 Kierkegaard Studies Yearbook
 Kierkegaard Studies Monograph Series

Living people
1961 births
20th-century American philosophers
21st-century American philosophers
American expatriate academics
American expatriates in Denmark
Université libre de Bruxelles alumni
Humboldt University of Berlin alumni
Kierkegaard scholars
University of California, San Diego alumni
University of California, Santa Cruz alumni
University of Münster alumni
Academic staff of the University of Copenhagen
Academic staff of the University of Iceland
Academic staff of the University of Los Andes (Colombia)
American historians of philosophy